The 2009–10 Maltese FA Trophy was the 72nd season since its establishment. It featured 21 teams from the Maltese Premier League, the First Division and the champions of the Gozo First Division. The competition started on 28 October 2009 and ended on 16 May 2010 with the Final from Ta' Qali Stadium. The defending champions were Sliema Wanderers, having won their 20th Maltese Cup last season.

Sliema Wanderers were the defending champions, but were eliminated in the quarter-finals by Hamrun Spartans.

Results and Format Change
When the draw was conducted, four teams received a bye to the Quarterfinals. Sliema Wanderers received a bye because they won the 2008–09 Maltese Cup. The other three teams qualifying directly to the Quarterfinals are Hibernians, Valletta and Birkirkara, for being the three best-placed teams in last year's Premier League.

Starting this year, the competition's format was changed slightly due to the inclusion into the competition of the reigning Gozo First Division champions. This is case for all future editions of this competition unless Gozo FC, a club which is based on Gozo but plays in the Maltese league system, is in either the Maltese Premier League or the Maltese First Division, in which case they would fill the spot reserved for the Gozo champions and the competition would feature 20 teams rather than 21. The inclusion of the Gozo champions meant that there was a single Preliminary Round match to reduce the field to 20 teams for the First Round.

Preliminary and First Round
In the Preliminary and First Round draws entered six Premier League teams placed 4th to 10th (except Sliema Wanderers) in last year's competition, 10 First Division teams and the reigning Gozo First Division champions, Sannat Lions. The Preliminary Round match was held on 28 October 2009, while the First Round matches were played on 31 October and 1 November 2009.

Preliminary round

|colspan="3" style="background:#fcc;"|28 October 2009

|}

First round

|colspan="3" style="background:#fcc;"|31 October 2009

|-
|colspan="3" style="background:#fcc;"|1 November 2009

|}

Second round
In this round entered the winners from the previous round. The matches were played on 20 and 21 February 2010.

|colspan="3" style="background:#fcc;"|20 February 2010

|-
|colspan="3" style="background:#fcc;"|21 February 2010

|}

Quarter-finals
In this round entered the winners from the previous round and the four teams that had received a bye. The matches were played on 3 and 5 April 2010.

Semi-finals
The four winners from the Quarterfinals entered this round. The matches were played on 17 and 18 May 2010.

Final
The two winners from the Semifinals entered this round. The final was played on 23 May 2010.

External links
 Official site

Maltese Cup
Cup
Maltese FA Trophy seasons